Hidden is a 2009 Norwegian psychological horror film written and directed by Pål Øie, which stars Kristoffer Joner, Karin Park and Bjarte Hjelmeland.

Plot
A small boy runs as fast as he can through a pitch-dark forest. Blinded by fear, the kid runs across a forest road without seeing the trailer truck coming. The truck misses the boy, with the driver starting to lose control of the vehicle. This triggers a chain reaction that leaves another boy without his family, who are killed when the trailer crashes into their car.

After his mother's death, KK (Kai Koss) returns to his hometown to settle her affairs. He has been away for 19 years, trying to escape and forget about his mother's cruel treatment of him. He soon realizes that he can't outrun his past. Various visions of past haunt the protagonist as he visits his ancestral house. At one point he decides to burn the house, but is deferred by the local police women. In the final catharsis of the protagonist he pushes his diabolic half burned brother Peter off the waterfall. In the end, police arrests KK for various murders which seem to have been committed by the alter ego Peter. Audience is left with the question of whether Peter is real or just a manifestation of KK's mangled distorted past.

Cast

Production
Hidden was produced by Alligator in Bergen, and the movie budget was slated by 12.6 million Norwegian krone.

Release
The film has received international attention as one of the featured films of the After Dark Horrorfest 4 and ran on 29 January 2010. The other seven films which ran at After Dark Horrorfest are Dread, The Graves, Lake Mungo, ZMD: Zombies of Mass Destruction, The Final, The Reeds and Kill Theory.

References

External links 
 

2009 films
2009 horror films
2000s thriller films
Norwegian horror films
Norwegian slasher films
2000s Norwegian-language films